Robert Menzies Hamilton (25 April 1924 – November 1999) was a professional footballer who played for Chester and Yeovil Town.

References

1924 births
1999 deaths
Scottish footballers
Association football forwards
Chester City F.C. players
English Football League players
Yeovil Town F.C. players
Footballers from Edinburgh